Hala Bashi was a Uyghur Muslim general of the Ming dynasty and its Hongwu Emperor.

Miao rebellions
Hala Bashi, a Uyghur general from Turpan, fought for the Ming dynasty against the Miao rebels during the Miao rebellions of 1370s. He led Uyghur troops to crush the Miao rebels and settled in Taoyuan County, Changde, Hunan.

References

Ming dynasty generals
Chinese Muslim generals